Dolores is a municipality in the Cabañas department of El Salvador.

Municipalities of the Cabañas Department